This is a list of islands of Eritrea.

Dahlak Archipelago 
Dahlak Kebir (formerly Dehalak Deset)
Dhuladhiya
Dissei
Dohul
Erwa
Harat
Harmil
Howakil
Isra-Tu
Nahaleg
Nora
Shumma

Other islands in the Red Sea 
Fatma Island
Halib
Hando
Hanish Islands
Howakil Islands
Massawa Island

See also 
 Geography of Eritrea

Islands
 
Eritrea